Turlington's Balsam of Life was a patent medicine developed by English merchant Robert Turlington.

Background
He succeeded in obtaining a royal patent from King George II in 1744, which gave him the right to pursue anyone attempting to pass off their own product as his, one of the earliest medicinal patents. In his patent application Turlington claimed that the balsam contained 27 ingredients, and was effective in the treatment of "kidney and bladder stones, cholic, and inward weakness", a list of ailments he greatly expanded upon in a 46-page brochure printed shortly afterwards. Turlington's Balsam quickly became popular in England and in the American colonies.

Packaging
During the 17th and 18th centuries, the manufacturers of patent medicines began to use packaging as a tool to differentiate their products from those of their competitors, as there was often little to visually distinguish between the medications themselves. In Turlington's case that resulted in his changing the shape of the bottle containing his balsam at least four times in the ten years following the granting of his patent, culminating in an elaborately embossed tablet-shaped bottle introduced in 1754.

References

Notes

Citations

Bibliography

Patent medicines